Ericeia lituraria is a moth in the  family Erebidae. It is found in central and southern Africa and on the islands of the Indian Ocean.

The wingspan is 25–30 mm.

References

Moths described in 1880
Moths of Madagascar
Lepidoptera of Uganda
Moths of the Comoros
Lepidoptera of the Republic of the Congo
Lepidoptera of Tanzania
Moths of Réunion
Moths of Sub-Saharan Africa
Ericeia